This is a list of cathedrals in the state of Ohio, United States:

See also
List of cathedrals in the United States

References

 Ohio
Cathedrals in Ohio
Ohio
Cathedrals